Simon Jönsson Berger, known as Simon J. Berger (born 1June 1979) is a Swedish actor. He is the son of musician Bengt Berger and artist Gittan Jönsson. He grew up in Stockholm and in Österlen. He was educated at the Fridhems Folkhögskola and Teaterhögskolan in Malmö, from which he graduated in 2007. Berger has also acted at Scen Österlen, Lunds Studentteater, Malmö Stadsteater and Royal Dramatic Theatre.

Berger became known to a wider Swedish audience by appearing in the 2007 television miniseries Upp till kamp, in which he played the leading role of Erik Westfeldt. He was given the role while he still studied at Teaterhögskolan.

Berger has also had the leading role in the Academy Award winning short film Istället för Abakadabra. He won a Prix d'Interprétation Masculine award at the
Brussels Short Film Festival for that role. In 2010, he made his debut role at the Dramaten as Val Xavier in the play Mannen med Ormskinnsjackan.

In 2012, he played the character Paul in the Jonas Gardell series Don't Ever Wipe Tears Without Gloves. The series was broadcast on Swedish Television. He also had a leading role in the 2012 film Call Girl.

In 2015, he played Isak Aronson in TV 4's murder mystery miniseries Modus, which was screened in Australia by SBS and in the UK by BBC Four

References

External links 

Living people
1979 births
Swedish male actors